Clinker built (also known as lapstrake) is a method of boat building where the edges of hull planks overlap each other.  Where necessary in larger craft, shorter planks can be joined end to end, creating a longer strake or hull plank. The technique originated in Scandinavia, and was successfully used by the Anglo-Saxons, Frisians, Scandinavians, typically in the vessels known as cogs employed by the Hanseatic League.  Carvel construction, where plank edges are butted smoothly, seam to seam, supplanted clinker construction in large vessels as the demand for capacity surpassed the limits of clinker construction. (See Comparison between clinker and carvel below.).

Examples of clinker-built boats that are directly descended from those of the early medieval period are seen in the traditional round-bottomed Thames skiffs, and the larger (originally) cargo-carrying Norfolk wherries of England.

Etymology
From clinch, or clench, a common Germanic word, meaning “to fasten together”.

Origin 
The technique of clinker developed in the Nordic shipbuilding tradition as distinct from the Mediterranean mortise and tenon planking technique which was introduced to the provinces of the north in the wake of Roman expansion. Overlapping seems to already appear in the 4th century BC Hjortspring boat. The oldest evidence for a clinker-built vessel, dendrochronologically dated to 190 AD, are boat fragments which were found in recent excavations at the site of the Nydam Boat. The Nydam Boat itself, built ca. 320 AD, is the oldest preserved clinker-built boat. Clinker-built ships were a trademark of Nordic navigation throughout the Middle Ages, particularly of the longships of the Viking raiders and the trading cogs of the Hanseatic League.

Planking

In building a simple pulling boat, the keel, hog, stem, apron, deadwoods, sternpost and perhaps transom are assembled and securely set up. In normal practice, this will be the same way up as they will be in use. From the hog, the garboard, bottom, bilge, topside and sheer strakes are planked up, held together along their ‘lands’ – the areas of overlap between neighbouring strakes – by copper rivets. At the stem and, in a double-ended boat, the sternpost, geralds are formed. That is, in each case, the land of the lower strake is tapered to a feather edge at the end of the strake where it meets the stem or stern-post.  This allows the end of the strake to be screwed to the apron with the outside of the planking mutually flush at that point and flush with the stem. This means that the boat's passage through the water will not tend to lift the ends of the planking away from the stem. Before the next plank is laid up, the face of the land on the lower strake is bevelled to suit the angle at which the next strake will lie in relation with it. This varies all along the land. Gripes are used to hold the new strake in position on the preceding one before the fastening is done.

Timbering or framing out
Once the shell of planking is assembled, transverse battens of oak, ash or elm, called timbers are steam-bent to fit the internal, concave side. Elm species are not durable where the boat is used frequently in fresh water. As the timbers are bent in, they are copper riveted to the shell, through the lands of the planking.

On many clinker built craft, e.g. in Scandinavia, in Thames skiffs, and larger working craft like the coble, sawn frames are used, assembled from floors and top timbers, joggled to fit the lands. Sometimes the timbers in larger craft were also joggled before being steamed in.

With the timbers all fitted, longitudinal members are bent in. The thwart risings are fastened through the timbers with its upper edge on the level of the undersides of the thwarts. Bilge keels are added to the outside of the land on which the boat would lie on a hard surface to stiffen it and protect it from wear. A stringer is usually fitted round the inside of each bilge to strengthen it. In a small boat, this is usually arranged to serve also as a means of retaining the bottom boards. These are removable assemblies, shaped to lie over the bottom timbers and be walked upon. They spread the stresses from the crew's weight across the bottom structure.

Longitudinals
Inboard of the sheer strake the heavier gunwale is similarly bent in along the line of the sheer. This part of the work is finished by fitting the breast hook and quarter knees. Swivel or crutch chocks are fitted as appropriate to the gunwale, the thwarts fitted down onto the rising and held in position by knees up to the gunwale and perhaps down onto the stringer. The structure of gunwale, rising, thwart and thwart knees greatly stiffens and strengthens the shell and turns it into a boat. There are several ways of fixing the rubbing strake but in a clinker boat, it is applied to the outside of the sheer strake.

Fittings
Finally, the fittings such as swivels or crutch plate, painter ring, stretchers, keel and stem band are fitted and fixed with screws. In a sailing dinghy, there would be more fittings such as fairleads, horse, shroud plates, mast step, toe straps  and so on.

Finishing
That more or less finishes the boatbuilder's work but the painter has yet to varnish or paint it. At stages along the way, they will have been called in to prime the timber, particularly immediately before the timbering is done. The boatbuilder will clean up the inside of the planking and the painter will prime it and probably more, partly because it is easier that way and partly so as to put some preservative on the planking behind the timbers. Similarly, it is best to have the varnishing done after the fittings are fitted but before they are shipped. Thus, the keel band will be shaped and drilled and the screw holes drilled in the wood of keel and stem then the band will be put aside while the varnishing is done.

Fastenings
The planks may be fastened together in several ways:

 With copper or iron rivets consisting of a square nail and a dish shaped washer called a rove. The land is pierced, the nail knocked through from the outside, the rove punched on while the head is held up by a dolly (a small portable anvil, usually of cylindrical shape). The nail is cut off just proud of the rove and the cut end clenched over the rove while the dolly  is used to hold the nail in place. In planking up clinker work, one man can hold both dolly and clenching hammer.  Although this is common where sawn frames are to be used, boats intended for steamed timbers are usually nailed but not clenched until the timbering out is complete. As timbering is a two handed job it is more efficient to leave the clenching until help is at hand then the helper dollies up, whilst the builder sits inside the hull and clenches up.
 With iron nails with the pointed nail ends protruding on the inside of the boat, bent over and back into the wood in the form of a hook. This technique is called clinching. It is the sort of thing which used to be found in Scandinavian-built boats but even with iron nails, on the lands, they were usually properly clenched over roves.  Nails fastening timbers were sometimes turned over, particularly where removable bottom boards were to rest on the timbers. However, it was possible to tread the bottom boards onto the clenched nails and where marks were left, gouge out recesses to accommodate the clenched nails.
 Screws were used for fixing the ends of the strakes to apron and transom and in later times, knees to gunwale and thwarts, but traditionally, this last would be done with a clench bolt or a large copper nail, clenched.
 Adhesive, notably epoxy. Traditionally, lands were neither glued nor was anything used to bed them. The garboard was bedded onto the hog and keel, and the ends of the strakes onto the stem and apron using a mixture of white lead and grease. During the World Wars new techniques and materials were developed by the aircraft industry. By the mid-1950s, these were well infiltrated into the boatbuilding trade. New boats in classes of racing dinghy with clinker hulls were built as glued clinker boats. The basic construction was the same but ply planking was used and the lands were glued with no fastenings, except that the ends and garboards were still screwed to apron and hog. The need to prevent the splitting of the planks was removed by the use of ply so no timbers were used. Except for a light gunwale and wide rubbing strake, the longitudinals were omitted too. A short thwart rising and knees were glued to the planking. These boats were all decked and that is how adequate stiffness was achieved. So that the liquid glue could be laid onto the land before the next plank was assembled onto it, they were built upside down.

Fastening the centre-line structure

In the last few years of wooden boat construction, glue and screws took over, but until the 1950s, the keel, hog, stem, apron, deadwoods, sternpost, and perhaps transom would be fastened together by bolts set in white lead and grease. There are three kinds of bolt used:
 of which, nowadays, the screw bolt (i.e. threaded bolt), with its nut and washer, is by far the most common.
 The second type of bolt is the pin bolt or cotter bolt, which, instead of a thread, has a tapered hole forged through the end away from the head, into which a tapered pin or cotter is knocked. The taper is in effect a straight thread. In conjunction with a washer, this draws the bolt tight, as a nut does on a screw bolt.
 The third type of bolt is the clench bolt.  It has some of the features of a rivet but was usually much longer than the normal rivet; in a wooden ship, perhaps a metre or more. For a shipwright's use, it is of copper. A head is formed by upsetting one end using a swage. It is then knocked through a hole bored through the work to be fastened, and through a washer. The head is held up with a dolly and the other end is upset over the washer in the same way as the head. Until well into the nineteenth century, this is what held the great ships of the world together, though some may have used iron. Until the late 1950s, the centre-line assembly of British Admiralty twenty-five foot motor cutters were fastened this way.

Where suitable metal was not available, it was possible to use treenails (pronounced trennels). They were like clench bolts but made of wood, and instead of being clenched, they had a hardwood wedge knocked into each end to spread it. The surplus was then sawn off.

Comparison between clinker and carvel

The Vikings used the clinker form of construction to build their longships from split wood planks. Clinker is the most common English term for this construction in both British and American English, though in American English the method is sometimes also known as lapstrake; lapboard was used especially before the 20th century to side buildings, where the right angles of the structure lend themselves to quick assembly.

The smoother surface of a carvel boat gives the impression at first sight that it is hydrodynamically more efficient. The lands of the planking are not there to disturb the stream line. This distribution of relative efficiency between the two forms of construction is an illusion because for given hull strength, the clinker boat is lighter.

Additionally, the clinker built method as used by the Vikings created a vessel which could twist and flex relative to the line extending length of the vessel, bow to stern. This gave it an advantage in North Atlantic rollers so long as the vessel was small in overall displacement. Increasing the beam, due to the light nature of the method, did not commensurately increase the vessel's survivability under the torsional forces of rolling waves, and greater beam widths may have made the resultant vessels more vulnerable.

There is an upper limit to the size of clinker built vessels, which could be and was exceeded by several orders of magnitude in later large sailing vessels incorporating carvel-built construction.  Clinker requires relatively wide planking stock compared to carvel, as carvel can employ stealers to reduce plank widths amidships where the girth is greatest.  The need for sufficient lap to accept the clench fastenings drives towards wider planks in proportion to thickness than can be employed in carvel. In all other areas of construction, including framing, deck, etc., clinker is as capable as carvel.  Clinker construction remains to this day a valuable method of construction for small wooden vessels.

UNESCO Intangible Cultural Heritage
The Nordic clinker boat tradition was inscribed to the UNESCO List of the Intangible Cultural Heritage on December 14, 2021, as the first joint Nordic application to the list.

See also 

 Classic Boat (magazine)
 Dragon Harald Fairhair (ship)
 Gableboat
 Montagu whaler
 Longship
 Naglfar
 Oselvar
 Rivet
 Yoal

Notes

References

Other sources
 Greenhill, Basil (1976). Archaeology of the Boat  (London:  Adam and Charles Black Publishers Ltd).  .
 Greenhill, Basil, and Morrison, John S. (1995). The Archaeology of Boats & Ships: An Introduction. (London: Conway Maritime Press) .
 McKee, Eric (1972). Clenched Lap or Clinker: An Appreciation of a Boatbuilding Technique (Greenwich: National Maritime Museum).
 Leather, John (1990). Clinker Boatbuilding (Adlard Coles). .

Shipbuilding